Sokolovo is a rural locality (a village) in Slednevskoye Rural Settlement, Alexandrovsky District, Vladimir Oblast, Russia. The population was 93 as of 2010.

Geography 
The village is located 4 km south from Slednevo, 10 km west from Alexandrov.

References 

Rural localities in Alexandrovsky District, Vladimir Oblast